Davide Ricci Bitti (born 12 February 1984) is an Italian former professional road cyclist.

In 2020 Bitti started racing again but this time as an amateur riding for Argon18–Hicari–Stemax. Bitti said "he competes for the sake of being with friends".

Career
He rode in the 2011 Giro d'Italia and finished in 148th place. In Stage 3 of the Giro Bitti was part of the four-man break which formed 30km into the 173km stage. Working with his fellow break-away riders they achieved a 3-minute gap fairly quickly. With 25km to go Gianluca Brambilla attacked over a climb followed closely by Pavel Brutt this surge in pace up the hill caused Bitti to lose contact with the breakaway. He would get caught by the Peloton with 2km to go. He would finish 194th on the stage 6'03" down on the winner. It wasn't until Stage 12 of the race that Bitti was in another breakaway. Once again there were four riders this time they established their break at 4km from the start. At 20km in they had a lead of4 minutes but with  setting the pace behind, for their sprinter Mark Cavendish, the lead never exceeded 4 minutes. At 25km to go the quartet had a lead of 2 minutes. By 12km to go they had been caught as  set up the sprint. Bitti finished the stage in 145th not losing any time. In August at the Volta a Portugal Bitti claimed his two best results of the season. The 2.2km Prologue where he finished in seventh place. Then in Stage 9 he came third in the mountain sprint to the line. Later in the season at the Giro dell'Emilia Bitti was once again in the break-away of the day gaining a lead of over 8 minutes 47km into the race. Their lead fell steadily after that with all the breakaway caught. Bitti then abandoned the race.

Major results
Sources:
2005
 1st Stage 1 Giro Ciclistico Pesche Nettarine di Romagna
 6th Giro del Casentino
 8th Targa Crocifisso
2006
 2nd Giro del Montalbano
2007
 1st Giro del Compitese
 1st GP Industria Casini 
 3rd Coppa San Geo
 5th Coppa Guinigi
2008
 3rd Trofeo FPT Tapparo
 4th GP Enel Monte Amiata

References

External links

1984 births
Living people
Italian male cyclists
Sportspeople from the Metropolitan City of Bologna
Cyclists from Emilia-Romagna